The Ven. Selwyn Closs-Parry (1925 – 13 October 2015) was Archdeacon of St Asaph from 1984 to 1990.

He was born in 1925 and educated at St David's College, Lampeter, and ordained after a period of study at St. Michael's College, Llandaff, in 1953.

He began his career as Curate of St Gwynan's, Dwygyfylchi. He held  He held incumbencies at Treuddyn and Llangystennin and Holywell. He was a Canon at St Asaph Cathedral from 1976 and later Archdeacon of the surrounding area. He died on 13 October 2015.

Notes

1925 births
2015 deaths
20th-century Welsh Anglican priests
Alumni of St Michael's College, Llandaff
Alumni of the University of Wales, Lampeter
Archdeacons of St Asaph